Abispa australiana is a species of wasp in the Vespidae family. It was described by Mitchell in 1838.

References

Potter wasps
Insects described in 1838